Hromadskyj Holos was a Ukrainian-language weekly newspaper published from Lviv. Hromadskyj Holos was the central organ of the Ukrainian Socialist-Radical Party.

References

Ukrainian-language newspapers
Defunct newspapers published in Poland
Mass media in Lviv
Weekly newspapers published in Poland
1895 establishments in Ukraine